Muhammad Abdallah Hussain (born 2 February 2002 in Jos) is a Nigerian professional footballer who plays for Nasarawa United F.C. in the Nigerian Professional Football League, the top-level football league in Nigeria, and the Nigeria national under-20 football team. He plays as a central midfielder or attacking midfielder.

Club career
On 7 January 2018, after impressing on a week-long trial, Mohammed Abdallah Hussain eventually signed permanently with Jos based side Mighty Jets on a year contract.

Nasarawa United 
In October 2019, Hussain moved from Mighty Jets to Nigerian Professional Football League side Nasarawa United F.C. on a one-year deal.

International career
In November 2020, Nigeria U20 team coach Ladan Bosso, invited him to be a part of the Nigeria U20 squad for 2020 WAFU Zone B U-20 Tournament hosted in Benin.

Career statistics

Club

Notes

References

Living people
2002 births
Association football midfielders
Nigerian footballers
Mighty Jets F.C. players
Nasarawa United F.C. players
Nigeria under-20 international footballers
Nigeria youth international footballers
Ljungskile SK players
Sportspeople from Jos